Theresa Burroughs (1929 – May 22, 2019) was an active participant in the civil rights movement during the 1960s. She worked to secure the right to vote for blacks in Alabama and the rest of the Southern United States. In 1965 she was attacked and arrested by state troopers and sheriff's deputies along with other civil rights demonstrators attempting to cross the Edmund Pettus Bridge in Selma, Alabama. She was the founder of the Safe House Black History Museum in Greensboro, Alabama, the location where the Reverend Dr. Martin Luther King Jr. was hidden from the Ku Klux Klan during his visit to Alabama in 1968. Burroughs was a childhood friend of King's wife, Coretta Scott King.

Burroughs was a cosmetologist and ran a beauty parlor called "In Beauty's Care" in Greensboro, which she opened a few years before the night she hid King in her mother's home next door to the beauty shop.

Her parents were Mattie and Napoleon Turner. She died on May 25, 2019 in Greensboro, Alabama at the age of 89.

References 

1929 births
2019 deaths
African-American activists
Activists for African-American civil rights
People from Greensboro, Alabama
Selma to Montgomery marches
People from Hale County, Alabama
Activists from Alabama
20th-century African-American women
20th-century African-American people
Women civil rights activists
21st-century African-American people
21st-century African-American women